Dominik Reiter (born 4 January 1998) is an Austrian professional footballer who plays as a forward for Rheindorf Altach.

Club career

LASK
He made his Austrian Football First League debut for LASK on 18 October 2016 in a game against SC Wiener Neustadt.

SCR Altach
On 22 June 2021, he signed a three-year contract with SCR Altach.

Career statistics

Club

References

External links
 
 Dominik Reiter  at LASK Linz' website

1998 births
People from Grieskirchen District
Living people
Austrian footballers
Austria youth international footballers
Austria under-21 international footballers
FC Juniors OÖ players
LASK players
SC Wiener Neustadt players
SC Rheindorf Altach players
2. Liga (Austria) players
Austrian Football Bundesliga players
Austrian Regionalliga players
Association football forwards
Footballers from Upper Austria